Mehrabad (also Romanized as Mehrābād and Meharābād; also known as Magrīābād) is a village in Amiriyeh Rural District, in the Central District of Arak County, Markazi Province, Iran. At the 2006 census, its population was 633, in 183 families.

References 

Populated places in Arak County